In the city of Hamilton, New Zealand, elections were held for the offices of Mayor of Hamilton and twelve members of the Hamilton City Council (HCC) on 12 October 2013. They were held as part of the 2013 New Zealand local elections. Referendums on city water fluoridation and to determine voting method for electing city councillors in the future were held simultaneously. Postal ballots were issued to 97,259 registered voters, and were returned from 23 September to 12 October 2013. Across the city, 37,276 people cast votes, a voter turnout of 38.33%. Some voters chose not to vote in particular elections or referendums, so voter turnout in individual elections varies from this figure.

Julie Hardaker was re-elected for her second term as mayor with 43.6% of the vote. First past the post (FPP) was used to elect the twelve members of the HCC—six from each of the East and West Wards. FPP was retained over single transferable vote (STV) as the method used to elect city councillors in future elections. A majority voted for the return of city water fluoridation.

Mayor

Incumbent mayor Julie Hardaker was re-elected with a 2,911-vote majority over Ewan Wilson.

City council

East Ward
The six candidates with the most votes were elected, shown in the table below by a green tick.

West Ward

Referendums

Water fluoridation

Background
Fluoride has been added to drinking water in Hamilton since 1966 to improve dental health. Hamilton sources its water from the Waikato River, which has a fluoride concentration of 0.1–0.3 parts per million (ppm); in 2012 fluoride concentration in Hamilton drinking water was 0.7 parts per million. Parts of southern and western Waikato District are also served by the Hamilton city water supply.

In 2006, a binding referendum was held in which 69.46% of voters supported continuation of public water fluoridation, while 30.54% opposed it. The referendum had a voter turnout of 38%. During the draft of the city council's 2011/12 annual plan in February 2011, the termination of water fluoridation was discussed by councillors, but no decision was made. 120 submissions related to water fluoridation were filed for the annual plan in March and April 2011. A referendum was planned to coincide with the 2013 local elections, but this was cancelled by the council on 8 June 2012 after taking legal advice that the referendum may not be deemed adequate public consultation. From 28 to 31 May 2013, public hearings were held and attended by councillors, and on 5 June 2013, the city council voted 7–1 (with five abstentions) to cease water fluoridation. The council wrote to Minister of Health Tony Ryall requesting that, as a health issue, water fluoridation be decided by the national government. The cost of water fluoridation was estimated by the city council as $48,000 per year.

Results

Aftermath
On election day, the referendum result was welcomed by both the chief executive and Medical Officer of Health of the Waikato District Health Board. As the referendum was not binding, a council vote was required to restart fluoridation. On 28 November 2013 the HCC delayed its decision pending a legal challenge to the decision by the South Taranaki District to fluoridate water there.  The HCC voted 9–1 in favour (3 abstentions) of refluoridating water on 27 March 2014. The lobby group Safe Water Alternative New Zealand (SWANZ) sought an interim order from the High Court to prevent fluoridation until their application for judicial review could be heard. The application for an interim order was dismissed on 27 June 2014. SWANZ removed its application for judicial review on 4 September 2014, ahead of the 9 September hearing.

Voting method

Notes

References

Hamilton
Politics of Hamilton, New Zealand
Hamilton